is a professional Japanese baseball outfielder for the York Revolution of the Atlantic League of Professional Baseball. He previously played in Nippon Professional Baseball (NPB) for the Yokohama DeNA BayStars.

Career

Yokohama DeNA BayStars
Otosaka began his professional career with the Yokohama DeNA BayStars of Nippon Professional Baseball (NPB) in 2012. He spent the 2012 and 2013 seasons with Yokohama's farm team, slashing .251 and .234, respectively. On May 26, 2014, Otosaka made his NPB debut, and notched his first career hit, a solo home run against the Chiba Lotte Marines, in one of only two at-bats on the year. In 2015, Otosaka played in 52 games for the BayStars, slashing .226/.276/.339 with 3 home runs and 10 RBI. For the 2016 season, Otosaka played in 55 games for the main team, hitting .270/.317/.374 with 1 home run and 8 RBI. The following season, Otosaka batted .190/.215/.333 with 2 home runs and 3 RBI in 83 games. After the 2017 season, he played for the Yaquis de Obregón in the Mexican Pacific League.

In 2018, Otosaka played in 73 games for Yokohama, posting a .204/.290/.226 slash line with no home runs and 7 RBI. The next season, he played in 97 games, slashing .245/.313/.358 with 2 home runs and 17 RBI. He spent the entire 2020 season with the club, making 85 appearances and hitting .208/.289/.267 with 1 home run and 7 RBI. On July 3, 2021.

Bravos de León
On January 31, 2022, Otosaka signed with the Diablos Rojos del México of the Mexican League. However, he was released on April 18, prior to the start of the LMB season. 

On April 29, 2022, Otosaka signed with the Bravos de León of the Mexican League. He played in 38 games for León, slashing .361/.427/.500 with one home run, 10 RBI, and 14 stolen bases.

Saraperos de Saltillo
On June 14, 2022, Otosaka was traded to the Saraperos de Saltillo of the Mexican League. He appeared in 40 contests for Saltillo down the stretch, hitting .374/.469/.456 with 2 home runs, 15 RBI, and 12 stolen bases.

York Revolution
On February 21, 2023, Otosaka signed with the York Revolution of the Atlantic League of Professional Baseball.

Personal life
His father is a former American ice hockey player.

References

External links

 NPB.com

1994 births
Living people
Japanese baseball players
Japanese people of American descent
Nippon Professional Baseball outfielders
Baseball people from Kanagawa Prefecture
Bravos de León players
Yaquis de Obregón players
Japanese expatriate baseball players in Mexico
Yokohama DeNA BayStars players